This list of Aquila Legis members includes alumni of the Ateneo Law School fraternity who attained prominence in various branches of government, or distinguished themselves in public life.

Prominent Members

Judicial Department

Supreme Court Justice Mariano Del Castillo
Supreme Court Justice Ricardo Rosario
RTC Judge Virgilio Gesmundo (Former Dean of Arellano Law)

Executive Department

Former Commission on Audit (COA) Chairman, former Executive Secretary, former Department of Justice (DOJ) Secretary, former Department of Foreign Affairs (DFA) Secretary and former Vice President Teofisto Guingona, Jr.
Former Department of Environment and Natural Resources (DENR) Secretary, former Department of Trade and Industry (DTI) Secretary and former Executive Secretary Ernesto "Ernie" Maceda
Former Muntinlupa Mayor, former Metropolitan Manila Authority (now MMDA) Chairman, former Presidential Spokesman, former Press Secretary (OPS) and now Monetary Board Member Ignacio "Toting" Bunye
Former Tagaytay City Mayor, former League of Cities President, and now Metro Manila Development Authority (MMDA) Chairman Francis Tolentino
Former Chief Presidential Legal Counsel Sergio Antonio "Serge" Apostol
Former Press Secretary (OPS) Ricardo "Dong" Puno, Jr.
Department of Transportation and Communications (DOTC) Secretary Joseph Emilio A. Abaya
Former Mandaluyong Mayor Neptali "Boyet" Gonzales II
Lipa City Mayor Meynardo "Meynard" Sabili
Barobo Surigao Del Sur Mayor Felixberto S. Urbiztondo

Legislative Department

Former Senate President Ernesto "Ernie" Maceda
Former Senator Teofisto Guingona, Jr.
Former Speaker of the House Prospero "Boy" Nograles
 Congressman Florencio “Bem” Noel (An Waray Partylist) 
Congressman Neptali "Boyet" Gonzales II (now Majority Floor Leader)
Congressman Sergio Antonio "Serge" Apostol (now chairman of the Committee on Banks and Financial Intermediaries)
Congressman Raul Del Mar
Former Congressman Ignacio "Toting" Bunye
Former Congressman Joseph Emilio A. Abaya 
Former Congressman Adam Relson Jala

Bar Topnotchers and Placers

Through the years, Aquila Legis has produced over 40 lawyers who reached the top ten of the Philippine Bar Examinations, four (now five) of whom placed first. A number of alumnus bar topnotchers have gone on to distinguished public careers in government.

References

External links
Aquila Legis Fraternity's official website (members only)

Aquila Legis